Leander Paes and Adil Shamasdin were the defending champions but chose not to defend their title.

Austin Krajicek and Jeevan Nedunchezhiyan won the title after defeating Kevin Krawietz and Andreas Mies 6–3, 6–3 in the final.

Seeds

Draw

References
 Main Draw

Fuzion 100 Ilkley Trophy - Men's Doubles
2018 Men's Doubles